In geometry, Hesse's principle of transfer states that if the points of the projective line P1 are depicted by a rational normal curve in Pn, then the group of the projective transformations of Pn that preserve the curve is isomorphic to the group of the projective transformations of P1 (this is a generalization of the original Hesse's principle, in a form suggested by Wilhelm Franz Meyer). It was originally introduced by Otto Hesse in 1866, in a more restricted form. It influenced Felix Klein in the development of the Erlangen program. Since its original conception, it was generalized by many mathematicians, including Klein, Fano, and Cartan.

See also
Rational normal curve

Further reading
Hawkins, Thomas (1988). "Hesses's principle of transfer and the representation of lie algebras", Archive for History of Exact Sciences, 39(1), pp. 41–73.

References

Original reference
Hesse, L. O. (1866). "Ein Uebertragungsprinzip", Crelle's Journal.

Projective geometry
Invariant theory
Group theory
Symmetry
Birational geometry